The Annunciation Council (Serbian Latin: Blagoveštenski sabor) was a council of ethnic Serbs in Austrian Empire which was held on 2 April 1861, on the day of the church holiday Annunciation.

Distinguished representatives of the Serbian people living in the Austro-Hungarian Empire met in the parliament and adopted a sixteen-point program. They accepted the emperor's condition that all Serbian demands should be made within Hungarian frameworks.

References

Further reading 
 
 
 

1860 in the Austrian Empire
1860 in law